Abdulkhakim is a masculine given name.

List of people with the given name 

 Abdulkhakim Gadzhiyev (born 1966), Russian politician
 Abdulkhakim Ismailov (1916–2010), Russian soldier
 Abdulkhakim Shapiyev (born 1983), Russian and Kazakhstani wrestler

See also 

 Abdul

Masculine given names
Asian given names